Ecuavisa is an Ecuadorian free-to-air television network that was launched on March 1, 1967 on Quito's channel 8 and Guayaquil's channel 2. It is one of the leading TV networks in the country. The channel has an international feed named Ecuavisa Internacional.

History
Ecuavisa was founded by Xavier Alvarado Roca and began to transmit programming on March 1, 1967. The network began broadcasting from Guayaquil and was originally known as Canal 2. The channel received support from Miami's WCKT, owned by Sydney Ansin.

On June 1, 1970, Ecuavisa started broadcasting to Quito and became known as Cadena de Unión Nacional (National Unity Network).

In the 1970s, Ecuavisa was able to increase its audience share by premiering new programming and starting broadcasting partnerships with regional providers. Ecuavisa also benefited from the advent of colour television, and was the first channel to broadcast in colour in Ecuador.

Many Ecuadorian celebrities participated in Ecuavisa's shows throughout the 1980s and 1990s. During these two decades, the network aired some of Ecuador's top television shows.

During the 2000s, Ecuavisa launched Ecuavisa Internacional, its international feed. The channel is broadcast in the United States on DirecTV and Verizon Fios. In Spain and Latin America, Ecuavisa Internacional is also broadcast as a free-to-air channel on Hispasat satellite.

On May 9, 2013, Ecuavisa launched its own high-definition feed, Ecuavisa HD.

Programming
Ecuavisa dedicates a great portion of its programming to international shows, mainly soap operas from Telemundo and Rede Globo, such as "El Clon" and "Bellisima".

Ecuavisa's programming is oriented to family entertainment, educational programs, and soap operas (novelas). In 2007, Ecuavisa is boosting its own productions, with "El hombre de la casa" (a remake of Man about the House) a classic British comedy. Other remakes made are La niñera (The Nanny) and "Kliffor" (a remake of The Cosby Show), that achieved great success in Ecuador's ratings profile.

Ecuavisa has a nightly news broadcast, Televistazo, which is currently the most watched news show in Ecuador. For years, it also aired programming for children, such as Dragon Ball and Doraemon from Japan. Non-anime series for children included Zooboomafoo, Little Robots, Sesame Street and Foster's Home for Imaginary Friends.

In 2015, Ecuavisa came under fire for replacing reruns of Dragon Ball with the local version of Chilean competition show Yingo. This resulted in a mass protest from viewers and a change to the program's timeslot.

References

External links

Television channels in Ecuador
Spanish-language television stations
Television channels and stations established in 1967
1967 establishments in Ecuador